The  doubles Tournament at the 2006 Family Circle Cup took place between April 10 and April 16 on the outdoor hard clay of the Family Circle Tennis Center in Charleston, United States. Lisa Raymond and Samantha Stosur won the title, defeating Virginia Ruano Pascual and Meghann Shaughnessy in the final.

Seeds

Draw

Finals

Top half

Bottom half

External links
 Main draw

Family Circle Cup - Doubles
Charleston Open
Family Circle